Sanja Nikčević (born 1960) is a Croatian theatre critic and distinguished professor of theatre history in the drama department of the Arts Academy of Osijek, Croatia. She is also head of the drama module of the doctoral program in literature at the Faculty of Philosophy, University of Osijek (Osijek, Croatia). She is the president of the Croatian Critics' Association and Governing Board of Matica hrvatska. Nikčević lives in Zagreb, Croatia.

Education and work
Nikčević was born in Varaždin. At the Faculty of Philosophy Zagreb she obtained a BA (French language and comparative literature, 1984), MA (1993) and Ph.D. (1998) in American drama. She worked as a journalist and theatre critic for the Croatian daily newspaper Večernji list (1985–1993), was an advisor for theatre in the Croatian Ministry of Culture (1996–1997), and was a freelancer.

Academic career
She was a Fulbright scholar twice (CUNY 1995, mentor M. Carlson UCSB 2002, mentor W. D. King) and lectured at the University of California, Santa Barbara, United States in 2001. Since 2003 she has been employed in the English department (Faculty of Philosophy, Osijek), teaching courses on American and British drama, where she still works in the Ph.D. literature program. Since  2007 she has been employed at the Arts Academy in Osijek (UAOS) where she teaches courses on the history of world drama and theatre.

Activities in international and national associations
Nikčević was the founder and first president (1994–2000) of the Croatian Center of ITI-UNESCO where she organized numerous international events (seminars, drama colony, exchange writers and directors, presentation of theatre of other countries in Croatia and vice versa).  Since 2004 she was secretary, since 2010 she was president of a national theatre critics' organization (HDKKT), and since 2014 she was a member of the main governing board of Matica hrvatska.
She has served as an EXCOM board member for ITI Worldwide for two terms and is an active member of numerous international and American associations of scholars and critics (ASTR, ATHE, IFTR, AICT, and ATCA).

Editorial activities
At the Croatian center of ITI Nikčević founded and edited the publication Croatian drama (the only publication on Croatian theatre in English) and Mansions. She was the editor of Mansions until 2004 and published more than thirty books. From 1998 to 2002 she was the editor of the Croatian mainstream theatre journal Theatre (Kazalište). She founded Ars Academica (a series of textbooks for the Arts Academy) where she was editor from 2009 to 2013.

Publishing activities and field of interest
Her main topics of research are American drama, contemporary European drama, Croatian war drama and theatre criticism and history of theatre. She has participated in more than one hundred national, American, and international symposiums. She has published more than one hundred articles on European and American theatre in English which were published in America (SSEP, PAJ), Hong Kong, Japan, Poland, Bosnia, Hungary, Slovakia, Macedonia and Slovenia in academic or theatre journals and academic-edited volumes, and forwards of books.  Nikčević publishes theatre reviews in the Croatian weekly cultural newspaper (Vijenac, Hrvatsko slovo). She has published six books and edited six anthologies.

American drama
In Croatia Nikčević has edited the Anthology of American Plays (1993) in two volumes and published three books on American drama:  The Subversive American Drama or Sympathy for Losers (1994); Affirmative American Drama or Long Live the Puritans(2003)and Losers' Genius in Our Town(Zagreb, 2006). 
In these books she introduced a new classification of American drama based on the attitude of plays toward the main American myth, the American dream. Plays depicting losers and failures of the American dream (from Eugene O’Neill, Arthur Miller, Tennessee Williams, Edward Albee and David Mamet, for example) she calls subversive. Plays that show characters who can accept their position in life and make the most of it (mainly solving their problems and achieving the American dream) she designates as affirmative American plays (from Thornton Wilder through comedies and melodrama to Harling's Steel Magnolias, Margaret Edson, etc.).

European drama and new trends
Nikčević's book on imposing a trend of in-yer-face theatre all over Europe, New European Drama or Great Deception, (Zagreb, 2005) was both attacked and praised simultaneously. It has been translated into Slovak (Bratislava, 2007) and Bulgarian (Ruse, 2009). Selected chapters were published in several languages – English (New Theater Quarterly, August 2005), Polish (Dialog  1/2005. str. 122–135.) and Hungarian ( u Szinhaz, Hungary, July 2005). The book has been used as a textbook in several universities and was reviewed around the world. It has been included as a rare non-English book as literature on the official website of in-yer-face theatre by British critic Aleks Sierz.  The book received the prestigious Croatian Award (Petar Brečić, 2006). After five years, in 2009, the second edition was published, including not just an additional chapter about the destiny of new European drama over those five years, but also reactions to the book (attacks and praise).

Croatian drama
Nikčević edited the first anthology of Croatian plays published outside Croatia: Anthology of Contemporary Croatian Drama (Macedonia, 2002). 
Her book on Croatian drama What is Croatian drama to us? (Zagreb, 2008), deals with some less-fashionable but very important writers (Tanja Radović, Miro Gavran), genres (the comedies of Ivan Kušan or literary cabaret of Borisa Senkera) and topics (the disappearance of political drama after the fall of communism, religious plays during wartime, etc.)

She offered a new classification of Croatian drama based upon the attitude of the drama toward reality, where she proves that this attitude has three points: politics, emotions and intertextuality. Some decades are dominant in dealing with one point: the 1960s and 1970s with politics as a means for the destruction of the individual (Ivan Kušan, Ivo Brešan, Dubravko J. Bužimski, Škrabe/Mujićić/Senker), the 1980s dealing with emotions and the inner world of the hero (Miro Gavran, Lada Kaštelan, Mate Matišić), authors of the 1990s are in search of intertextuality (Ivan Vidić, Asja Srnrc Todorović, Tomislav Zajec), while the latest period is in search of the voice between these three points.

Croatian war drama (on the Homeland war)
Edited:  
 Anthology of Croatian War Plays 1991-1995 (Zagreb, 2011) where she included 11 plays (Nino Škrabe: , Davor Špišić: , Matko Sršen: , Katja Šimunić: Blueblanche, Milan Grgić: , Lada Martinac/Snježana Sinovčižć: , Goran Tribuson: , Zvonimir Zoričić: , Miroslav Mađer: , Zvonimir Majdak: ,). 
 Anthology of Croatian War Comedies 1991-1997 (Vinkovci, 2013) where she included eight comedies  (Milica Lukšić: , Tahir Mujičić/Boris Senker: , Lydia Scheuermann Hodak: , Zvonimir Zoričić: , Miro Gavran: , Ivan Kušan: , Ljubomir Kerekeš: ,).  
 Anthology of Croatian Post-War Plays 1996-2011 (Zagreb 2014) where she included 12 plays (Lydia Scheuermann Hodak:  [1992/1996], Pavao Pavličić:  [1996], Hrvoje Barbir Barba:  [1997], Vlatko Perković: Deus ex machina [1997], Slobodan Šnajder: Ines & Denise [1997], Dubravko Mihanović:  [2004], Gordana Ostović:  [2005], Tena Štivičić: Fragile [2005], Amir Bukvić:  [2006], Igor Hamer:  [2007],  Lada Martinac:  [2009], Miro Međimorec:  [2011]).

The anthologies and Nikčević's theoretical work on the topic (Plays on Homeland War of one hundred titles from cabaret till allegory, published in the journal Republika 7-8/2012. p. 67-91) are changing the usual beliefs that there are no war plays from the Homeland War or that these plays are not of a good quality. Her research showed that from 1990 to 2011 more than one hundred professional Croatian plays were published or performed, plays that are connected with the topic either directly, through a character connected with the war, or through allegory (speaking about another war but with direct inspiration from the Homeland War).

Analysis of a play shows the completely different attitudes of war plays (written during 1990–1995 or 1997) and postwar plays (written after 1995 of 1997). War plays were affirmative and warm plays, melodramas and comedies helping the audience to survive their crazy and illogical reality, giving some hope. Plays depict possible solutions to conflict, and even when the hero dies or is killed, at the end, warm and positive emotions about them live on (love, friendship, faith, love for homeland) that allow the audience to feel and go through an intense and purifying catharsis. After-war plays are completely different. Although each play contains the author's ideological and political views, in post-war plays about the Homeland War, this is quite obvious. So-called "left" authors consider the former system good and blame Croatia for what they call civil war. On the other side, so-called "right" writers consider communism the worst ideology ever, and wish for Croatian independence from Yugoslavia and see the Homeland War as a result of Serbian aggression towards Croatian territory. Both sides however consider the society we live in as the failure without any solution or exit for good and honest characters, without any catharsis at the end for the audience. Both sides try to understand reasons for it – the left thinks the guilt is on Croatian nationalists who destroyed communism and former Yugoslavia in the moment that things were good. The right thinks former communists are to blame who now mimicries  the democratic political system and destroy the new society. Post-war comedy is even darker: it is grotesque to laugh at the aberration of society, but laughter stays frozen at the end because aberration is forever. (Mate Matišić, Nina Mitrović, etc.)

Theatre criticism
Nikčević edited a collection on essays in English Theatre Criticism Today (2002) as a result of three symposiums on theatre criticism that she organized in the Croatian centre of ITI (Pula 1998 i 1999, Zagreb 2000). She published the first theoretical book on theatre criticism in Croatia: Theatre Criticism or Inevitable Companion (2012), where she compared two different attitudes toward theatre criticism (European and American) with a new definition of the genre.

Awards
1999: Honorary citizen of Waterford, Connecticut, USA

2000: The Order of Croatian Pleter by the President of the Republic of Croatia, for the promotion of Croatian culture

2006: New European Drama or Big Deception (2005), Award Petar Brečić, for book on theatre

2013: Theatre Criticism or Inevitable Companion (2012), Award Antun Gustav Matoš Matica Hrvatska, for best critical book

Main Publications

Books (Croatian)
 Theatre Criticism or Inevitable Companion (2012, Award  A.G. Matoš).
 What is Croatian Drama to Us?, Naklada Ljevak, Zagreb, 2008
 Losers' Genius in Our Town, Zagreb, Faculty of Philosophy, 2006 
 New European Drama or Big Deception, Meandar, Zagreb, 2005 (translated: into English NTQ 83/2005, Slovak, 2007, Bulgarian 2009., Award Petar Brečić 2006., second edition Zagreb, 2009),
 Affirmative American Drama or Long Live the Puritans, Croatian center of  ITI, Zagreb, 2003 
 Subversive American Drama or Sympathy for Losers, CDM, Rijeka, 1994

Translations (other languages)
 "British Brutalism, the ‘New European Drama’, and the Role of the Director" NTQ (New Theater Quarterly), published by Cambridge University Press, 83/2005, p. 255-272 
 "" (Let's make new European drama) Szinhaz, Hungary, July 2005 (translated from English by Keszthelyi Kinga) 
 "" (Everything has consequences), Dialog (Poland) 1/2005. str. 122–135.

Articles published in English (selection)
 "Sanja Nikcevic: The Comeback of Political Drama in Croatia: Or How to Kill a President by Miro Gavran" in Political Performances. Theory and Practice. IFTR/FIRT Political Performances Working Group. Haedicke, Susan C., Deirdre Heddon, Avraham Oz and E.J. Westlake (Eds) Amsterdam/New York, NY, 2009, IV, 379 pp. Pb: 978-90-420-2606-3
 "Croatian Theatre and the War 1992-1994" in Theatre and performance in Eastern Europe. The Changing Scene ed.  Dennis Barnett and Arthur Skelton, The Scarecrow press, Plymouth, 2008.
 "How to Impose Violence as a Trend?" u Theatre and Humanism in a World of Violence, (24 congress of the IACT), urednici Ian Herbert, Kalina Stefanova, St. Kliment Ohridski University Press, Sofia, 2009. 57–72.
 "Angles on the stage Religious Theatre in Croatia 1945-1989; 1999-1994; 1996-2002" in Europassion. Kirche-Konflikte-Menschenrechte. Rudolf Grulich zum 60. Geburstag, Gehard Hess Verlag bad Schussenried, 2006. 
 “Actors Under Power” Theatre Year Book 2003 Theatre Abroad, ITI Japan Centre, Tokyo, 2003:160-167
 "Political Correctness, Identity, War and Lost Communication" in  Lužina, Jelena ur. Balkan Theatre Sphere, Fakultet dramskih umjetnosti, Skopje, Maceodnia, 2003. p .89-95

Notes
 http://journals.cambridge.org/action/displayAbstract?fromPage=online&aid=319009&fileId=S0266464X05000151
 http://www.goodreads.com/author/show/4752054.Sanja_Nik_evi_
 https://muse.jhu.edu/login?auth=0&type=summary&url=/journals/performing_arts_journal/v026/26.2nikcevic.html
 https://archive.today/20141026153101/http://www.hciti.hr/en/876/sanja-nikcevic-afirmativna-americka-drama-ili-zivjeli-puritanci-2003/
 http://hrcak.srce.hr/index.php?show=clanak&id_clanak_jezik=181550&lang=en
 http://www.atds.org/about-us/experts-list/
 http://americantheatrecritics.org/leadership-and-committees/

References

External links
 Faculty of philosophy, Osijek 
 Academy of Arts, Osijek
 Ministry of science, Croatia (list of works)
 Ministry of science Croatia, (who is who)
 Croatian Writers' Society

1960 births
20th-century Croatian non-fiction writers
20th-century Croatian women writers
21st-century Croatian non-fiction writers
21st-century Croatian women writers
Croatian theatre critics
Living people